The 2020 Indianapolis 8 Hours was an endurance race held on 4 October 2020 at the Indianapolis Motor Speedway in Speedway, in Indiana, United States. The event was open to cars in GT classes, namely GT3 and GT4. It was the inaugural running of the Indianapolis 8 Hour, replacing the previous American leg of the Intercontinental GT Challenge, the California 8 Hours held at WeatherTech Raceway Laguna Seca. It was the second leg of the 2020 Intercontinental GT Challenge and the sixth and final round of the 2020 GT World Challenge America. The GT World Challenge America results would be determined by the race results after three hours instead of the full eight hours.

22 cars started the race, 12 GT3 entries and 10 GT4 entries. Just three of the entries had also raced in round 1 of the Intercontinental GT Challenge held in Australia in February.

The race was dominated by BMWs. The German Walkenhorst Motorsport team finished first and second after eight hours, lead by the #34 BMW M6 of Dutch driver Nicky Catsburg, American driver Connor De Phillippi and Brazilian driver Augusto Farfus. BMW M4s also finished first and second in the GT4 class.

Class structure 
Cars competed in the following four classes.
 GT3 Overall
 GT3 Pro/Am
 GT3 Silver Cup
 GT4

Entries

Results

Top 10 shootout

Race

 Race time of winning car: 8:00:55.390
 Race distance of cars on the lead lap: 1177.500 km
 Fastest race lap: 1:23.310 – Nicky Catsburg on lap 219

References

External links
 
 

Indianapolis
Indianapolis